My Mistress is a 2014 Australian film.

Plot
A sixteen-year-old boy discovers his father's suicide. Distraught, he goes searching for ways to numb the pain. He then meets a mysterious woman who turns out to be a dominatrix and finds solace in her arms.

Production
Filming took place on the Gold Coast.

The production of the film had the BDSM consultancy of the Brazilian dominatrix Kalyss Mercury and the French dominatrix Maîtresse Françoise.

Notes

References

External links

Review at SBS movies

2014 films
Australian erotic drama films
Erotic romance films
Films set in Queensland
BDSM in films
Films shot on the Gold Coast, Queensland
2010s English-language films
2010s Australian films